Trent Edward Thornton (born September 30, 1993) is an American professional baseball pitcher for the Toronto Blue Jays of Major League Baseball (MLB).

High school and college
After graduating from Ardrey Kell High School in Charlotte, North Carolina, Thornton played college baseball at the University of North Carolina for the North Carolina Tar Heels. As a freshman he went 12–1 with a 1.37 ERA in 29 games, as a sophomore he went 7–4 with a 2.73 ERA in 16 games, including 14 starts. In 2014, he played collegiate summer baseball with the Orleans Firebirds of the Cape Cod Baseball League. As a junior, he went 3–7 with a 5.08 ERA in 28 appearances (four of which were starts). After his junior year, he was selected by the Houston Astros in the fifth round of the 2015 Major League Baseball draft and he signed.

Professional career

Houston Astros organization
Thornton made his professional debut that season with the Short Season-A Tri-City Valley Cats and spent the whole season there, going 4–0 with a 3.27 ERA in 15 games (12 starts). In 2016, he played for the Advanced-A Lancaster JetHawks and the Double-A Corpus Christi Hooks, compiling a combined 10–5 record with a 3.52 ERA in 24 games (21 starts), and in 2017, he pitched for Corpus Christi and the Triple-A Fresno Grizzlies, posting a 9–6 record and a 5.21 ERA in 25 games (23 starts) between the two clubs. He spent 2018 with Fresno. He was named the Pacific Coast League Pitcher of the Week for June 11–17 after pitching 7 scoreless innings in which he allowed only one hit (given up with two outs in the eighth inning) to go along with two walks. In 24 games (22 starts) for the Grizzlies, Thornton went 9–8 with a 4.42 ERA.

Toronto Blue Jays
On November 17, 2018, Houston traded Thornton to the Toronto Blue Jays for Aledmys Díaz. The Blue Jays added him to their 40-man roster a few days later. After participating in 2019 spring training, it was announced that Thornton had made the Opening Day roster on March 26. He made his MLB debut on March 31, starting against the Detroit Tigers. He produced five shutout innings, and his eight strikeouts established a new franchise record for strikeouts in an MLB debut. Thornton earned his first career win on May 14 at the San Francisco Giants, allowing two runs and striking out seven in 5 innings. He also had two hits and scored two runs in the interleague game, which Toronto won 7–3.

With the 2020 Toronto Blue Jays, Thornton appeared in three games, compiling a 0-0 record with 11.12 ERA and six strikeouts in 5 innings pitched. In 2021 with the Blue Jays, he pitched to a 1-3 record and 4.78 ERA with 52 strikeouts over 49 innings.

On January 13, 2023, Thornton signed a one-year, $1 million contract with the Blue Jays, avoiding salary arbitration.

References

External links

 

1993 births
Living people
American expatriate baseball players in Canada
Baseball players from Pittsburgh
Buffalo Bisons (minor league) players
Corpus Christi Hooks players
Fresno Grizzlies players
Lancaster JetHawks players
Major League Baseball pitchers
North Carolina Tar Heels baseball players
Orleans Firebirds players
Scottsdale Scorpions players
Toronto Blue Jays players
Tri-City ValleyCats players